S.S. Basket Napoli was an Italian professional basketball club that was based in Naples, Campania. The club's full name was Società Sportiva Basket Napoli. The team ceased activities in 2009. 

For past club sponsorship names, see sponsorship names.

History
The team was playing in the second division LegaDue as Serapide Pozzuoli when it was moved to Naples and came under the ownership of Mario Maione. After the 2001–2002 season, the club was promoted to the first division Serie A after winning the LegaDue. Basket Napoli took part in the ULEB Cup 2004-05, in the 2006-07 EuroLeague and won the Italian Cup in 2006.

In September 2008, Basket Napoli was excluded from the Serie A along with Orlandina Basket due to financial problems. 
Restarting from the regional leagues, the side was dissolved in 2009.

Notable players 

2000's
  Tierre Brown 1 season: '06-'07
  Larry O'Bannon 1 season: '06-'07
 - Tyrone Ellis 1 season: '06-'07
  Ansu Sesay 2 seasons: '05-'07
  Michel Morandais 2 seasons: '05-'07
  Lynn Greer 1 season: '05-'06
  Jeff Trepagnier 2 seasons: '04-'05, '06-'07
  Jerome Allen 2 seasons: '03-'05
  Michael Andersen 3 seasons: '02-'05
  Bennett Davison 2 seasons: '02-'04
  Óscar Torres 2 seasons: '02-'04
  Mike Penberthy 4 seasons: '01-'05
  Dontae' Jones 2 seasons: '01-'03
  Henry Williams 1 season: '01-'02
  Andre Hutson 1 season: '01-'02
  LaMarr Greer 2 seasons: '00-'01, '02-'03
  John Turner 2 seasons: '00-'02
  Randolph Childress 1 season: '00-'01
 - Nikola Radulović 1 season: '00-'01 
  Andrea Dallamora 1 season: '00-'01

1990's
  Stefano Rajola 4 seasons: '99-'03
  Venson Hamilton 1 season: '99-'00
  Bill Jones 2 seasons: '98-'00
  Charles Smith 2 seasons: '98-'00
 - Michael Richmond 1 season: '98-'99
  Gianluca Lulli 2 seasons: '97-'99
  Darren Morningstar 1 season: '97-'98
 - Larry Middleton 1 season: '96-'97
  Marty Embry 1 season: '96-'97
  Alex English 1 season: '91-'92
1980's
  Russell Cross 1 season: '86-'87
2000's
  Domenico Morena 14 seasons: '87-'95, '99-'00, '02-'07

Sponsorship names 
Throughout the years, due to sponsorship, the club has been known as :
Serapide Pozzuoli (1995–99)
Record Napoli (1999–01)
Pastificio di Nola Napoli (2001–02)
Pompea Napoli (2002–05)
Carpisa Napoli (2005–06)
Eldo Basket Napoli (2006–08)

References

External links 
 Serie A historical results  Retrieved 23 August 2015

1946 establishments in Italy
2009 disestablishments in Italy
Basketball teams established in 1946
Basketball teams in Campania
Defunct basketball teams in Italy
Basketball teams disestablished in 2009
Sport in Naples